Robert Poyntz (1359–1439) was the member of Parliament for the constituency of Gloucestershire for the parliaments of 1415 and 1417.

References 

Members of the Parliament of England for Gloucestershire
English MPs 1415
1359 births
1439 deaths
English MPs 1417